The ACE Urban is an electric city car produced by the ACE EV Group from 2022.

History
In addition to the Yewt and Cargo, the Australian startup that aims to develop electric cars in 2019 also introduced a small passenger car called the ACE Urban. Like the two afformentioned models, the car adopted oval proportions with two-tone body paint and an upturned window line. The vehicle can transport up to 4 people.

Pre-orders of the Urban became available in February 2021 and it is expected to reach its first customers in Australia in mid-2022. The vehicle is to be manufactured in Adelaide, along with the company's other products.

Specifications 
Like other models in the ACE range, the Urban hatchback offers a range of 150 to 200 kilometers on a single charge, depending on driving style. Also, the Urban has a maximum speed of 60 Mph and also takes up to 8 hours to charge. The Urban starts at $35,995 AUD however it also has many optionals like Seat heating and a soft carpet. Power assited steering is also only an optional, which is unusual for a modern car.

References

Cars of Australia
Electric city cars
All-wheel-drive vehicles
Upcoming car models